Che Dio ci aiuti is an Italian TV series that has been broadcast in Italy since December 2011.

Che Dio ci aiuti (translation: May God help us) is an Italian TV series. The pilot was aired in Italy on December 15, 2011.

Plot 
Sister Angela (whose name before being a nun was Lorenza Rapetti) runs the bar "L'Angolo Divino", a particular bar inside a convent based in Modena. 
She decided to turn the convent into a Student Accommodation with bar because it risked the closing for a series of economic difficulties, even if her Mother Superior (Sister Costanza) didn't agree.

The bar acts as a meeting for people of varying kinds, especially students. Sister Angela speaks to them and learns about their daily life, often helping to solve their problems.

Season 1 is focused more on crime scenes, due to the helping of Inspector Marco Ferrari, while in Seasons 2, 3 and 4 Sister Angela helps people in hospital, due to the job of Margherita (Miriam Dalmazio), Carlo (Andrés Gil) and Monica (Diana del Bufalo). 
Even if they often don't approve Sister Angela's behaviour, the Mother Superior and the lawyer Guido Corsi always end up helping her in her adventures.

Season One

Season Two

Season Three

Season Four

Season Five

Cast 

Elena Sofia Ricci as Sister Angela (season 1 -), a woman who decided becoming a nun after having spent some time in prison. While she was a teenager, along with her boyfriend committed a robbery and killed a man. She decided to dedicate her life to every kind of people in need and that is why she is always snooping around in a good way. 
She is a kind of mum for the girls who live in the convent.

Valeria Fabrizi as Sister Costanza, the Mother Superior (season 1 - ) she really likes Sister Angela and supports her even if sometimes doesn't approve her ideas. She wants only peace and tranquillity to pray, but this never happens. When at dinner, she likes to drink a glass of Lanbrusco Wine. She is really kind hearted and, even if she doesn't want to be involved in Sister Angela's plans, she always end up helping her.
She likes all the people who live in the convent, but particularly Cecilia, Davide and Valentina.

Francesca Chillemi as Azzurra Leonardi (season 1 - ), a selfish, spoiled, rich girl who is forced to live in the convent as a punishment for having stolen a ring from a jewellery. Her father is a famous notary who has never paid attention to her, leading Azzurra to discomfort. She later falls in love with the lawyer and professor Guido Corsi. They will split up briefly during season 3 due to the arrival of a new guy, Dario, but they will come back together at the end of the season and will marry in season 4.
She has a step-sister, Rosa (Neva Leoni) and a child, Emma, whom she thought had lost forever.
 
Serena Rossi as Giulia Sabatini (season 1)

Massimo Poggio as Inspector Marco Ferrari (season 1). He is the son of the man that was killed during the robbery. His mother, before dying too, wrote to Sister Angela asking her to take care of Marco, who never forgave his father's murderers. During season 1 he meets Giulia Sabatini, a former girlfriend, who hides a secret from him.

Laura Gaia Piacentile as Cecilia Sabatini (season 1), Giulia and Marco's daughter.

Lino Guanciale as Guido Corsi (season 2 - 4), a charming lawyer who works as a tutor for the Student Accommodation. His wife had cheated on him with his best friend and got pregnant. At the time of the first season, his wife died and leave him alone with her son, Davide, whom she hope Guido will adopt even if he's not his son. He will later fall in love with Azzurra Leonardi and marry her. He died together with Davide in a car accident six months after their departure.

Miriam Dalmazio as Margherita Morbidelli (season 1-3). Margherita is a kind, smiley, positive and outgoing girl. She is Azzurra's opposite and this leads to many fights between them, especially in season 1. She believes in love at first sight and falls in love with many guys, often breaking her heart. In season 1 she is still a medical student, while is season 2 and 3 she works as a doctor. In the hospital she meets the Resident Francesco Limbiati (Luca Capuano) and begins a relationship with him. The two break up when Margherita discover that he was already married. She then starts dating the cardiopathic patient Emilio della Rosa (Ludovico Fremont) and marries him. The two have a daughter, Anna, but Emilio dies tragically for a heart attack. Margherita learns to love again thanks to The Super Cute Doctor Carlo.

Laura Glavan as Nina Cristaldi (season 2-3)

Rosa Diletta Rossi as Chiara Alfieri (season 2)

Cesare Kristian Favoino as Davide Corsi (season 2 - 4), the son of Guido's former wife Manuela. Davide will be legally adopt by both Guido and Azzurra in season 4. Happiness will last only six months, as he and Guido will die in a tragic car accident.

Neva Leoni as Rosa Francini (season 3), Azzurra's step-sister.

Andrés Gil as Doctor Carlo Romero, (season 3) aka Dottorino Tanto Carino (the Super Cute Doctor). He works with Margherita at the hospital in Fabriano. At the beginning the two barely could stand each other but they will end up marrying.

References 

Italian television series
Italian legal television series
RAI original programming